Jack Nissenthall (later shortened to Jack Nissen) was a British Royal Air Force electronics and radar expert who played a key role in the Dieppe raid. His actions during the operation resulted in the Allies' gaining vital intelligence about the type, density and location of German radar installations along the Channel coast. The intelligence gathered by his actions also spurred the development of Allied radar jamming countermeasures, the technology of which Nissenthall also assisted in developing after the raid. His role in radar development and his actions during the Dieppe raid were never officially acknowledged, and he received no awards.

Early life

Jack Maurice Nissenthall was born in Bow, London, on 9 October 1919, the son of Jewish immigrants. He was educated at Malmesbury Road primary school and Mansford technical school. From an early age Nissenthall had shown a great interest and aptitude in electronics and wireless, and took a position with EMI in 1935 at the age of sixteen, firstly at the EMI factory in Hayes, Hillingdon and then at their main retail outlet in Tottenham Court Road. At the same time he was enrolled at the Regent Street Polytechnic studying advanced electronics.

R.A.F Apprentice and early wartime service 

In 1936, Nissenthall was talent scouted by the R.A.F and given an apprenticeship which involved him working during his free time at the experimental radar station at Bawdsey Manor in Suffolk, thus involving him at a critical period in the pioneering work of Robert Watson-Watt and his team. On the outbreak of war in September 1939, Nissenthall volunteered for service in the R.A.F. His request for flight duties was refused and instead he was posted to R.A.F Yatesbury where he was assigned to the first R.D.F (Radio Direction Finding) training school in Britain. Thereafter he was posted to various radar installations across the country. His skills and his abilities were increasingly being recognised by higher authority, as indicated by his suggestions for technical improvement of equipment being regularly accepted without question. By early 1942, with the rank of sergeant, he was stationed at Hope Cove in Devon, where he had been instrumental in establishing a pioneering Ground-control intercept (G.C.I.) facility. This and his other contributions had by this time led to him being nicknamed "The G.C.I king".

Volunteering for a special assignment
Since being rejected for aircrew service due to the value of his technical knowledge, he made it known he was prepared to be involved in special assignments where his knowledge would be of use, and would often give up his leave to pursue further training, including taking the commando course.

In early 1942 Nissenthall was ordered to report in person for an interview in London and was asked to volunteer for a dangerous assignment.

Operation Jubilee

Operation Jubilee, or the Dieppe Raid, was an Allied attack on the German-occupied port of Dieppe during the Second World War. The raid took place on the northern coast of France on 19 August 1942.
Nissenthall was selected to enter the Pourville Radar Station to gain vital intelligence on the new German Freya radar, and was escorted by a team of 11 men from the South Saskatchewan Regiment, to protect him but also to prevent his capture, due to his exceptional technical knowledge.

He was to attempt to enter the radar station and learn its secrets, accompanied by a small unit of 11 men of the Saskatchewans as bodyguards. Nissenthall volunteered for the mission fully aware that, due to the highly sensitive nature of his knowledge of Allied radar technology, his Saskatchewan bodyguard unit was under orders to kill him if necessary to prevent him from being captured. He also carried a cyanide pill as a last resort.

Nissenthall and his bodyguards failed to enter the radar station due to strong defences, but Nissenthall was able to crawl up to the rear of the station under enemy fire and cut all telephone wires leading to it. This forced the crew inside to resort to radio transmissions to talk to their commanders, transmissions which were intercepted by listening posts on the south coast of England. The Allies were able to learn a great deal about the location and density of German radar stations along the channel coast thanks to this one single act, which helped to convince Allied commanders of the importance of developing radar jamming technology. Of this small unit, only Nissenthall and one other returned safely to England.

Due to the clandestine nature of his mission, he was not presented any awards for his actions.

Later years
After the war, Jack Nissenthall shortened his surname to Nissen. He married and moved to South Africa.

In 1978, he emigrated to Canada, where he died in 1997

References 
Citations

Bibliography

 Atkin, Ronald. Dieppe 1942: The Jubilee Disaster. London: Book Club Associates, 1980. .
 Leasor, James. Green Beach''' London: House of Stratus, 2001. .
 Nissen, Jack Maurice. Winning the radar war''. London : Hale, 1989 .
See also his chapter in 'Fighting Back' by Martin Sugarman, Valentine Mitchell 2017

External links
 Jack Nissen and radar

1919 births
1997 deaths
People associated with radar
Royal Air Force personnel of World War II
People from Bow, London
Alumni of the University of Westminster
British emigrants to South Africa
British emigrants to Canada